William Charles Johnson (October 6, 1960 – January 20, 2018) was a pitcher in Major League Baseball who played from 1983 to 1984 for the Chicago Cubs. Listed at 6' 5", 205 lb., he batted and threw right handed.

Johnson was originally signed as an amateur free agent by the Philadelphia Phillies in 1980. He was traded along with Dick Ruthven from the Phillies to the Cubs for Willie Hernández on May 22, 1983.

Johnson died on January 20, 2018, at the age of 57.

References

External links
, or Retrosheet

1960 births
2018 deaths
Baseball players from Wilmington, Delaware
Central Oregon Phillies players
Chicago Cubs players
Iowa Cubs players
Madison Muskies players
Major League Baseball pitchers
Midland Cubs players
Peninsula Pilots players
Reading Phillies players
Spartanburg Phillies players